The Accreditation Committee of Cambodia (ACC) is a national higher education quality and assessment body of Cambodia. The ACC was established in Phnom Penh in March 2003 under the supervision of the Council of Ministers chaired by the Deputy Prime Minister Sok An to develop the standard of education in Cambodia.

Institutions 
Partial list of higher education institutions in Cambodia supervised by the ACC:
 Asean University (now PPIU)AU
 Asia-Europe University AEU 
 Angkor University
 Build Bright University BBU 
 Cambodian Mekong University CMU 
 Chamroeun University of Polytechnic CUP 
 City University, Cambodia CU 
 Cambodian University of Specialization CUS 
 Economics and Finance Institute
 International University, Cambodia
 International Institute of Cambodia IIC
 Institute for Business Education (formerly SITC) IBE
 Institute of Cambodia
 Institute of Technology of Cambodia ITC
 Institute of the Town of Angkor
 Institute of European Union
 Khemarak University
 Moyarishi Vedic University
 Norton University NU
 Newton Thilay University NTU
 National University of Management NUM
 National Institute of Posts, Telecoms and ICT NIPTICT
 Panha Chiet University PCU
 Pannasastra University of Cambodia PUC
 Royal University of Phnom Penh RUPP
 Royal University of Agriculture RUA 
 Royal University of Fine Arts RUFA 
 Royal University of Law and Economics RULE
 Royal Academy of Cambodia
 Setec University SU
 Svay Rieng University SRU
 University of Cambodia UC
 University of Human Resources
 University of Law and Economics
 University of Management and Economics UME
 University of Puthisastra UP
 University of Technology of Phnom Penh
 University Health Sciences
 Vanda Institute of Accounting VIA
 Western University WU
 Wan Lan University
 Zaman University ZAMANU
 Phnom Penh International University - PPIU PPIU

External links 
 Accreditation Committee of Cambodia (ACC) website
 Cambodia e-Gov Homepage
 Ministry of Education, Youth & Sports, Cambodia

Organisations based in Cambodia
Education in Cambodia